Jimmy Connors claimed the title for the first time, defeating Ken Rosewall in the final.

Seeds

  Jimmy Connors (champion)
  Arthur Ashe (quarterfinals)
 N/A
  Adriano Panatta (quarterfinals)
  Roscoe Tanner (quarterfinals)
  Ken Rosewall (final)
  John Newcombe (second round)
  Harold Solomon (second round)
  Ross Case (first round)
  Bob Lutz (second round)
 N/A
  Stan Smith (second round)
  Brian Gottfried (semifinals)
  Dick Stockton (second round)
  Tom Gorman (second round)
  Cliff Richey (quarterfinals)

Draw

Finals

Top half

Bottom half

References
General

Specific

1976 Alan King Tennis Classic